Cal Poly athletics may refer to:

Cal Poly Humboldt Lumberjacks, the athletic program at Cal Poly Humboldt in Arcata, California
Cal Poly Mustangs, the athletic program at Cal Poly San Luis Obispo in San Luis Obispo, California
Cal Poly Pomona Broncos, the athletic program at Cal Poly Pomona in Pomona, California